Palm Cottage may refer to:

Palm Cottage Gardens, Gotha, Florida
 Palm Cottage (Miami, Florida)
 Palm Cottage (Naples, Florida)